Edwards is a town in Hinds County, Mississippi, United States. The population was 1,034 at the 2010 census, down from 1,347 at the 2000 census. It is part of the Jackson Metropolitan Statistical Area.

History

Edwards is named for Dick Edwards, owner and proprietor of the Edwards House in Jackson, Mississippi.

Edwards was originally named "Amsterdam" and settled in the 1830s. In 1832 it suffered from a cholera epidemic and was then bypassed by the Alabama and Vicksburg Rail Road. This happened in 1839 when R. O. Edwards' plantation became a stop on the railroad known as Edwards Depot.

The depot was burned to prevent its use during the Civil War in 1863. The current site of Edwards was chosen in 1866 and was incorporated in 1871.

In 1882 the Southern Christian Institute was opened by the Christian Church (Disciples of Christ) in the town to educate African-Americans. It later became Bonner-Campbell College. In 1897 Edwards suffered an attack of yellow fever that killed many residents of the town.

Geography
Interstate 20 runs along the northern border of the town, with access from Exit 19. I-20 leads east  to Jackson, the state capital, and west  to Vicksburg.

Demographics

2020 census

As of the 2020 United States Census, there were 995 people, 404 households, and 193 families residing in the town.

2010 census
As of the 2010 United States Census, there were 1,034 people living in the town. The racial makeup of the town was 82.4% Black, 15.4% White, 0.7% Native American, 0.1% Asian and 0.6% from two or more races. 0.9% were Hispanic or Latino of any race.

2000 census
As of the census of 2000, there were 1,347 people, 461 households, and 335 families living in the town. The population density was 808.2 people per square mile (311.4/km2). There were 505 housing units at an average density of 303.0 per square mile (116.8/km2). The racial makeup of the town was 78.92% African American, 20.19% White, 0.15% Asian, 0.07% from other races, and 0.67% from two or more races. Hispanic or Latino of any race were 0.97% of the population.

There were 461 households, out of which 32.1% had children under the age of 18 living with them, 32.5% were married couples living together, 33.0% had a female householder with no husband present, and 27.3% were non-families. 23.0% of all households were made up of individuals, and 10.2% had someone living alone who was 65 years of age or older. The average household size was 2.90 and the average family size was 3.47.

In the town, the population was spread out, with 29.6% under the age of 18, 9.0% from 18 to 24, 27.8% from 25 to 44, 21.1% from 45 to 64, and 12.5% who were 65 years of age or older. The median age was 34 years. For every 100 females there were 82.3 males. For every 100 females age 18 and over, there were 75.6 males.

The median income for a household in the town was $29,231, and the median income for a family was $31,786. Males had a median income of $26,094 versus $19,500 for females. The per capita income for the town was $12,308. About 19.0% of families and 22.5% of the population were below the poverty line, including 32.4% of those under age 18 and 18.7% of those age 65 or over.

Education
Edwards is served by the Hinds County School District, and is zoned to Bolton/Edwards Elementary-Middle School in Bolton and Raymond High School in Raymond.

Jackson/Hinds Library System operates the Lois A. Flagg Library in Edwards, adjacent to the Edwards Head Start Center.

Notable people
 Rev. Carnella Barnes, pioneering African-American Christian Church (Disciples of Christ) minister
 Betty Currie, personal secretary of Bill Clinton, moved to Waukegan, Illinois as a child
 George Flaggs Jr., mayor of Vicksburg, Mississippi
 Johnny Fuller, blues and rock 'n' roll musician
 Otis Harris, track and field athlete who won gold and silver medals at the 2004 Summer Olympics
 George W. Lee, vice-president of the Regional Council of Negro Leadership
 Fiddlin' Joe Martin, blues musician
 Charlie Patton, blues musician and inductee in the Mississippi Musicians Hall of Fame; born near Edwards in 1891
 Melvin Powell, Negro league baseball pitcher
 Aurelius Southall Scott, educator and newspaper editor
 Norman Francis Vandivier, aviator

References

External links

Town of Edwards official website

Towns in Hinds County, Mississippi
Populated places established in the 1830s
1830s establishments in Mississippi